The southern (or armless) flounders are a small family, Achiropsettidae, of flounders found in Antarctic and sub-Antarctic waters. There are four genera, each with one species.

The bodies of southern flounders are greatly compressed, with both eyes on the left side of their heads. The caudal fin is separate, and the pectoral fins are rudimentary or entirely absent; none of the fins has spines. The lateral line is straight and well-developed.

Little is known of the habits of the species in this family.

See also
Paralichthys lethostigma, another species of a different order also sometimes called a "southern flounder"

External links

Achiropsettidae